Richard F. Syron is a former chairman and chief executive officer of the Federal Home Loan Mortgage Corporation, commonly known as Freddie Mac. He previously served as chairman and CEO of Thermo Electron Corp., and as CEO of the American Stock Exchange.

Early life and education
Syron graduated from Boston College with a bachelor's degree and earned advanced degrees in economics from Tufts University.

Career

Paul Volcker and Federal Reserve of Boston
He served as assistant to Paul Volcker, then the chairman of the Federal Reserve Board, in 1981 and 1982, and previously served as deputy assistant secretary of the United States Treasury. In that  with responsibility for developing the department's position on all domestic economic policy issues, and extensive interaction with other executive branch agencies, Congress and the public.

Syron held a senior post at the Federal Reserve Bank of Boston from 1989 through 1994, and was a member of the Federal Open Market Committee, which sets monetary policy.

American Stock Exchange
He joined the American Stock Exchange as CEO in 1994 held that post for five years, which included its merger in 1998 into the National Association of Securities Dealers.

Thermo Electron and Freddie Mac
Syron joined Thermo Electron as CEO in 1999, and moved to his post at Freddie Mac in 2003. In 2004, David Andrukonis, the chief risk officer of Freddie Mac, warned Syron of increasing risk in Freddie Mac's portfolio.  Syron declined to act. In December 2007, Syron told financial analysts that he expected Freddie Mac would incur heavy losses because of the weakening housing market and rising mortgage defaults.  Despite these forecasts, and concerns over the fiscal stability of Freddie Mac due to larger-than-expected write-offs, Syron reportedly took home over $19 million in cash, stocks, and other executive compensation in 2007.  Syron was terminated September 6, 2008, under a Federal Housing Finance Agency plan for conservatorship of Freddie Mac. It was not known at the time if he would receive a severance package.

On December 9, 2008, he testified before the United States House Committee on Oversight and Government Reform on Capitol Hill regarding Fannie Mae, Freddie Mac, and financial market instability.

References 

 Freddie Mac CEO got $19.8 million in 2007
 Top Executive Profiles, Richard F. Syron, Portfolio.com

External links

1943 births
American chief executives of financial services companies
American financial businesspeople
Boston College alumni
Federal Reserve Bank of Boston presidents
Living people
Tufts University School of Arts and Sciences alumni